Himanshu Gulati (born 16 June 1988) is a Norwegian politician representing the Progress Party. Gulati was the chairperson of the Progress Party's Youth from 2012 to 2014. He served as State Secretary in the Ministry of Justice and Public Security from 2013 to 2014, and at the Office of the Prime Minister from 2014 until 2017. In 2017 he was elected as a representative in the Norwegian parliament from Akershus, where he has served in the Committee on Justice.

Early life and education
Born in Førde, Norway to an Indian family who immigrated to Norway from New Delhi during the 1970s, his father is a physician, and his mother is a physiotherapist. He grew up in the rural village of Lavik, Høyanger where his father worked as a general practitioner before relocating to Lillestrøm, Akershus at the age of fourteen.
Parallel to his involvement in politics, Gulati for a time studied medicine before deciding it was not for him. He later received a bachelor's degree in Economy and Leadership from BI Norwegian Business School, as well as having attended a six-month course in filmmaking at an academy in India.

Political career
After taking an early interest in politics, he joined the FpU, or the youth organization of the Progress Party at the age of fifteen.
He was elected chairperson of the Progress Party's Youth, on 24 March 2012 after previously having been vice-chairperson for two years. Apart from this he is also currently serving as a deputy member to the Storting.
On a local level he has since 2007 been a representative on the Skedsmo municipal council, representing FrP. He was an outspoken critic of the Red-green coalition, especially on issues of foreign policy, immigration and taxation.

When Solberg's Cabinet was formed in October 2013 after the Norwegian parliamentary election, Gulati was appointed state secretary for Anders Anundsen in Ministry of Justice and Public Security. Aged 25, he became the youngest state secretary in the cabinet.

Awards and achievements

References

1988 births
Living people
BI Norwegian Business School alumni
Deputy members of the Storting
Members of the Storting
Norwegian people of Indian descent
Norwegian state secretaries
People from Skedsmo
People from Førde
Progress Party (Norway) politicians
Recipients of Pravasi Bharatiya Samman